Guitalens-L'Albarède is a commune in the Tarn department in southern France. On 29 June 2007, the commune was formed by the amalgamation of Guitalens and Lalbarède

See also
Communes of the Tarn department

References

Communes of Tarn (department)